Kimiko is feminine Japanese given name. Notable people with the name include:

Kimiko Burton, former San Francisco Public Defender
, professional tennis player
 Kimiko Douglass-Ishizaka, German pianist and weightlifter
 , Japanese swimmer
 Kimiko Gelman, Japanese American actress
 Kimiko Glenn, Japanese-American actress and singer
 Kimiko Hahn, poet
, Japanese women's basketball player
, Japanese-American actress
, Japanese singer
, Japanese voice actress
Kimiko Nishimoto (born 1928), Brazilian-born Japanese photographer and internet celebrity
, Japanese manga artist
, Japanese actress
 Kimiko Raheem, Sri Lankan swimmer

Fictional characters
, main character from the webcomic Megatokyo
 Kimiko Nakamura, secondary fictional character from the TV series Heroes
 Kimiko Tohomiko, character from the animated television series Xiaolin Showdown
Kimiko, nicknamed "the Female (of the species)", a character from the comic The Boys and its TV adaptation
 Kimiko "Thunderbolt" Ross, character from the webcomic Dresden Codak

See also
 Kimiko, a 1935 Japanese film directed by Mikio Naruse

Japanese feminine given names